Fate/Apocrypha is a Japanese light novel series in Type-Moon's Fate franchise, written by Yūichirō Higashide and illustrated by Ototsugu Konoe. Type-Moon published five volumes from December 2012 to December 2014. A manga adaptation illustrated by Akira Ishida is serialized in Kadokawa Shoten's Comp Ace magazine. An anime television series adaptation by A-1 Pictures aired from July to December 2017.

Plot

Fate/Apocrypha takes place in an alternate timeline from Fate/stay night. In the Third Holy Grail War that happened during the Second World War, Darnic Prestone Yggdmillennia steals the Greater Grail for the Third Reich, but then double crosses them and smuggles it for himself, taking it to Romania. Sixty years later, the Yggdmillennia clan declare war upon the Mage's Association in the Greater Grail War, pitting two teams of Servants against one another. Yggdmillennia and the Mage's Association's teams are referred to as the Black and Red factions respectively.

Kairi Shishigou, a necromancer hired by the Clock Tower, summons the Saber-class Mordred. The Red faction is led by priest Shirou Kotomine, though Shishigou remains independent, distrusting him. Shirou and his Servant, Semiramis, subdue the other masters of Red, stealing their command spell to control their Servants: Karna, Atalanta, Achilles, William Shakespeare, and Spartacus. The Black faction's Servants include Vlad III, Siegfried, Chiron, Astolfo, Avicebron, and Frankenstein's monster. Their rebellious seventh member, Jack the Ripper, murders her intended master in favour of prostitute Rika Rikudou.

Jeanne d’Arc is summoned as the mediating Ruler-class in the war, inhabiting the body of Laeticia, a French student. Receiving visions of Shirou, Jeanne tries to reach the Red faction, but they travel in Semiramis’ Hanging Gardens of Babylon towards Yggdmillennia's domain in Trifas. Spartacus is captured by Yggdmillennia after trying to storm their domain.

Yggdmillennia use homunculi to fuel the mana sustaining the Servants’ presence. Astolfo helps a male homunculus escape. When the homunculus is mortally wounded in the escape attempt, Siegfried sacrifices himself by giving his enchanted heart to the boy. Jeanne takes the homunculus, Sieg, into her custody, leaving him in the care of a hermit. Sieg decides he wishes to liberate the homunculi, returning to Trifas during battle.

As the Black and Red factions clash, the Greater Grail is transported into the Hanging Gardens. Frankenstein's monster and Spartacus die fighting Mordred. Sieg defends Astolfo from Mordred, discovering he can temporarily transform into Siegfried. Mordred decapitates Astolfo's master Celenike Icecolle Yggdmillennia, Sieg becomes Astolfo's new master.

Whilst storming the Hanging Gardens, Darnic fuses with Vlad, becoming a vampire, but is slain by Shirou. Jeanne and the gathered Servants discover Shirou is in fact Amakusa Shirou Tokisada, a Ruler-class Servant summoned by the Einzberns in the Third Holy Grail War. Shirou wishes to use the Grail's power to bring about eternal happiness for mankind, materialising their souls in a new world. Aside from Mordred, the Red faction and Avicebron agree to help him. Avicebron distracts Yggdmillennia whilst the Red faction escape, using his master Roche Frain Yggdmillennia to power his Noble Phantasm, but is killed by Sieg and Mordred.

The Black faction form an alliance with Shishigou, Mordred, Sieg, and Jeanne to stop Shirou. They eliminate Rika and Jack the Ripper, Jeanne purifying the latter's soul. Jeanne falls in love with Sieg, assuming they are Laeticia's feelings, and has visions of Sieg dying in battle. Fiore Forvedge Yggdmillennia, the de facto leader of the Black faction, surrenders her magic and title to her brother Caules, unwilling to take a life as necessary.

The Black faction attack the Hanging Gardens using a fleet of airplanes. Upon Karna's request, Caules transports the captured Red faction's masters to safety. During the assault, Chiron, Karna, Atalanta, Achilles, Shishigou, and Mordred die. Jeanne confronts  Shakespeare, who taunts her with the visions of Sieg's death. He then introduces Gilles de Rais, summoned as a Saber, to convince Jeanne of Shirou's wish.

Shirou's wish is granted by the Greater Grail, activating on his command. Upon Sieg's arrival, Jeanne convinces Gilles to redeem himself for past sins by siding with them. Jeanne and Gilles sacrifice themselves to stop Shirou, though Laeticia is spared. Empowered by the combined power of Siegfried and Frankenstein's Monster, Sieg is able to defeat Shirou, who is given a painless demise by Semiramis via a poisoned kiss. The remaining Red servants vanish soon after.

Sieg and Astolfo, being the winners of the war, speak to the Grail's avatar Justeaze Lizrich von Einzbern, who explains Shirou's wish will occur, but it will prevent humanity from evolving. Sieg requests that he be transformed into Fafnir, transporting the Grail to the Reverse Side of the World, where its magic will be neutralised. In the war's aftermath, Astolfo sets off to explore the world. Some unknown time later, Jeanne's spirit reunites with Sieg, confessing her love to him as they began a new journey together.

Media

Light novels
Fate/Apocrypha is written by Yūichirō Higashide and illustrated by Ototsugu Konoe. Fate/Apocrypha was originally introduced as a canceled project for an online game, with various details and character designs by various artists collected in Fate/complete material IV Extra material. In November 2011, it was announced as a new project called Fate/Apocrypha, and in early December, Higashide confirmed on Twitter that he is writing Fate/Apocrypha as a light novel. On December 15, 2011, in the seventh volume of Type-Moon Ace magazine, it was first published as a short story penned by Higashide as the first chapter. Although some story elements were present, the short story itself has no relation to the final version of the story presented in the novels. The original planned number of books was four, but Higashide later confirmed that the story was eventually extended to five books. The defunct original online game project has since been rebooted as Fate/Grand Order.

Manga
A manga adaptation, illustrated by Akira Ishida, began serialization in Kadokawa Shoten's Comp Ace magazine with the August 2016 issue sold on June 25.

Anime

An anime television series, directed by Yoshiyuki Asai and produced by A-1 Pictures, aired from July 2 to December 30, 2017, on Tokyo MX and other channels. The series ran for 25 episodes. Yūichirō Higashide wrote the scripts, Yūkei Yamada designed the characters, and Masaru Yokoyama composed the music. The series is streamed on Netflix in Japan. The first twelve episodes of the series began streaming on Netflix outside of Japan on November 7, 2017. Aniplex of America later released the series on Blu-ray in two sets on November 20, 2018, and February 12, 2019, with a full English dub. Madman Entertainment acquired the series for a home video release in Australia and New Zealand, and MVM Entertainment acquired the series for a home video release in the UK and Ireland.

Music
From episodes 13 onwards, the second opening theme is "Ash" by LiSA while the ending theme is "Koe" by Asca. The series' soundtrack, consisting of two CDs, was composed by Masaru Yokoyama.

References

External links
  
 
  at Netflix
 

2017 anime television series debuts
2012 Japanese novels
A-1 Pictures
Anime and manga based on light novels
Cultural depictions of Joan of Arc
Cultural depictions of Vlad the Impaler
Cultural depictions of Arthurian legend
Fiction about death games
Fate/stay night anime
Fate/stay night manga
Fate/stay night novels
Light novels
Tokyo MX original programming
Netflix original anime
Novels set in Romania
Romania in fiction
Seinen manga
Novels about spirit possession
Type-Moon